Blekingska Nationen (Province of Blekinge student community) was founded in 1697 and is today one of Lund University's thirteen student nations concentrating on musical activities. The emphasis is on alternative music, and several well-known bands have performed on their stage. These include The Cardigans, Alphaville, bob hund, The Soundtrack of Our Lives, Broder Daniel, The Ark, The Hives, Spearmint, Bad Cash Quartet, Jens Lekman, Ballboy, My Favorite, The Radio Dept., The Hidden Cameras, The Knife and Moneybrother.

Blekingska Nationen's Friday club, Indigo, celebrated its tenth anniversary in 2004, and it is this club that has carried the organisation forwards. Before the club was founded in 1994, the organisation had only 500 members. At the tenth anniversary of the club, this number had grown to 2000. Currently, the nation has around 1,200 members.

Notes

External links

  Official website

Nations at Lund University
1697 establishments in Sweden